Gymnometriocnemus is a genus of non-biting midges in the subfamily Orthocladiinae of the bloodworm family (Chironomidae). The genus is divided into two subgenera, Raphidocladius Sæther 1983 (four species - brumalis, kamimegavirgus, tairaprimus and volitans) and Gymnometriocnemus Goetghebuer, 1932 (eleven species - ancudensis, benoiti, brevitarsis, johanasecundus, lobifer, longicostalis, subnudus, terrestris, mahensis, nitidulus and wilsoni) (Ashe and O’Connor 2012). Males of the former subgenus are characterized by possessing an extremely long virga with needle-like sclerotization, species of the later characterized by a short virga and a weakly developed crista dorsalis in the adult male hypopygium (Stur and Ekrem 2015).

References
Ashe P, O’Connor J.P. 2012. A world catalogue of Chironomidae (Diptera). Part 2. Orthocladiinae. Irish Biogeographical Society & National Museum of Ireland, Dublin, 968 pp.

Goetghebuer M. 1932. Diptères. Chironomidae IV. (Orthocladiinae, Corynoneurinae, Clunioninae, Diamesinae). Faune de France 23: 1–204.

Sæther O.A. 1983. A review of Holarctic Gymnometriocnemus Goetghebuer, 1932, with the description of Raphidocladius subgen. n. and Sublettiella gen. n. (Diptera: Chironomidae). Aquatic Insects 5: 209–226. doi: 10.1080/01650428309361148.

Stur E, Ekrem T. 2015. A review of Norwegian Gymnometriocnemus (Diptera, Chironomidae) including the description of two new species and a new name for Gymnometriocnemus volitans (Goetghebuer) sensu Brundin. ZooKeys 508: 127–142.

Chironomidae
Diptera of Europe